A freeway is a common name for different types of limited-access highways.

Freeway or Free Way may also refer to:

Highways
Controlled-access highway
mostly in the form of divided highways
Two-lane expressway, sometimes called a "two lane freeway"

Film, TV and entertainment
Freeway (1988 film), a thriller starring Darlanne Fluegel and James Russo
Freeway (1996 film), a crime film starring Kiefer Sutherland and Reese Witherspoon
Freeway (video game), a 1981 game for the Atari 2600
Freeways (video game), a 2017 game on Steam and mobile
Freeway, a family pet dog in the 1980s TV series Hart to Hart

Music
Freeway (band), a Dutch rock band
Freeway (rapper) (born 1978), American rapper
Freeway, a UK rock band featuring Terry Slesser

Albums
Freeway (album), a 2003 album by Smash!!
Freeways (album), a 1977 album by Bachman–Turner Overdrive
Freeways (EP), a 1985 EP by Men Without Hats
Freeway (EP), a 2013 EP by Flux Pavilion

Songs
"Free Way", a 2006 song by Rain
"Freeway" (song), a 1952 song by Chet Baker recorded with the Gerry Mulligan Quartet
"Freeway", a song by Aimee Mann from Smilers
"Freeway", a song by the Soup Dragons from Hydrophonic
"Freeway", a song by Squarepusher from Selection Sixteen
"Freeway", a song by TV on the Radio from OK Calculator

Other uses
"Freeway" Rick Ross (born 1960), American author and convicted drug trafficker 
Freeway (software), a web design application for Mac OS X
Freeway Airport, Mitchellville, Maryland, U.S.
Freeway Park, Seattle, Washington, U.S.

See also

Northeast Freeway (disambiguation)
Southeast Freeway (disambiguation)